This is a list of all personnel changes for the 1953 NBA off-season and 1953–54 NBA season.

Events

August 23, 1953
 The Milwaukee Hawks sold Mel Hutchins to the Fort Wayne Pistons.

August 27, 1953
 The Baltimore Bullets traded Jim Baechtold to the New York Knicks for Jim Luisi, Max Zaslofsky and Roy Belliveau.

September ?, 1953
 The Baltimore Bullets traded Don Barksdale to the Boston Celtics for Herm Hedderick, Mo Mahoney, cash, Jim Doherty and Vernon Stokes.

September 25, 1953
 The Rochester Royals released Red Holzman.

October 7, 1953
 The Milwaukee Hawks signed Red Holzman as a free agent.

October 27, 1953
 The Minneapolis Lakers sold Lew Hitch to the Milwaukee Hawks.

November 23, 1953
 The Milwaukee Hawks traded Bob Lavoy to the Syracuse Nationals for Noble Jorgensen.
 The Milwaukee Hawks signed Bob Peterson as a free agent.

November 25, 1953
 The Baltimore Bullets traded Max Zaslofsky to the Milwaukee Hawks for Bob Houbregs.

November 29, 1953
 The Milwaukee Hawks traded Jack Nichols to the Boston Celtics for Fred Eydt, J.C. Maze, John Azary, Paul Unruh and Tom Lillis.

December 21, 1953
 The Milwaukee Hawks traded Max Zaslofsky to the Fort Wayne Pistons for Chuck Share.
 The Milwaukee Hawks traded Lew Hitch to the Minneapolis Lakers for Bobby Watson.

December 29, 1953
 The Fort Wayne Pistons sold Fred Schaus to the New York Knicks.

January ?, 1954
 The Milwaukee Hawks signed Dick Surhoff as a free agent.

February 2, 1954
 The Minneapolis Lakers sold Bob Harrison to the Milwaukee Hawks.

February 18, 1954
 The Baltimore Bullets traded Leo Barnhorst to the Fort Wayne Pistons for cash.

May 28, 1954
 The Boston Celtics sold Chuck Cooper to the Milwaukee Hawks.

Notes
 Number of years played in the NBA prior to the draft
 Career with the franchise that drafted the player
 Never played a game for the franchise

External links
NBA Transactions at NBA.com
1953-54 NBA Transactions| Basketball-Reference.com

References

Transactions
1953-54